William Cecil Holborn Sadler (24 September 1896 – 12 February 1981) was an English first-class cricketer active 1920–29 who played for Surrey. He was born in King's Cross; died in Wandsworth.

References

1896 births
1981 deaths
English cricketers
Surrey cricketers
Durham cricketers